The "Magnificent Seven" is an informal term applied to seven large private cemeteries in London. They were established in the 19th century to alleviate overcrowding in existing parish burial grounds as London’s population grew during the Victorian era.

Background
For hundreds of years, almost all London's dead were buried in small parish churchyards, which became dangerously overcrowded. Architects such as Sir Christopher Wren and Sir John Vanbrugh deplored this practice and wished to see suburban cemeteries established. It was not until British visitors to Paris, including George Frederick Carden, were inspired by its Père Lachaise cemetery that sufficient time and money were devoted to canvass for reform, and equivalents were developed in London: first at Kensal Green.

In the first 50 years of the 19th century, the population of London more than doubled from 1 million to 2.3 million. Overcrowded graveyards also led to decaying matter getting into the water supply and causing epidemics. There were incidents of graves being dug on unmarked plots that already contained bodies, and of bodies being defiled by sewer rats infiltrating the churchyards' drains from the relatively central Tyburn, Fleet, Effra and Westbourne rivers which were used as foul sewers by this date and later wholly discharged into London's outfall sewers.

The cemeteries
In 1832, Parliament passed an act encouraging the establishment of private cemeteries outside central London. Over the next decade seven cemeteries were established, at least four of which were consecrated by Charles James Blomfield, Bishop of London:

The Burial Act 1852 section 9 required new burial grounds in a list of urban parishes of London (the Metropolis) to be approved by the Secretary of State. Sections 1 and 44 enabled the Secretary of State to close metropolitan London churchyards to new interments and make regulations regarding proper burial. The expenses for establishing burial boards to accommodate these changes were ordered to come from the poor rates under section 19. Sections 26 and 28 of that act enabled parish Burial Boards (with vestry approval) to purchase land anywhere and to appropriate land belonging to the relevant parish, poor board or any of its charitable trusts.
In 1981 the architectural historian Hugh Meller dubbed the group of cemeteries "The Magnificent Seven" after the 1960 western film of the same name.

See also 

 List of cemeteries in London

References

External links
 The National Federation of Cemetery Friends website 
 Photographic studies of each one of London's Magnificent Seven Cemeteries

Cemeteries in London
Tourist attractions in London
Architecture in the United Kingdom